Fougerolles may refer to:
Places
Fougerolles, Indre, a commune in the French region of Centre
Fougerolles, Haute-Saône, a commune in the French region of Franche-Comté
Fougerolles-du-Plessis, a commune in the Mayenne department of France

Surname
Hélène de Fougerolles, a French actress